Gemmules are internal buds found in sponges and are involved in asexual reproduction. It is an asexually reproduced mass of cells, that is capable of developing into a new organism i.e., an adult sponge.

Role in asexual reproduction

Asexual reproduction in sponges occurs via budding, either by external or internal buds. The internal buds are called gemmules. Only endogenous types of buds develop into new sponges.

Characteristics
Gemmules are resistant to desiccation (drying out), freezing, and anoxia (lack of oxygen) and can lie around for long periods of time. Gemmules are analogous to a bacterium's endospore and are made up of amoebocytes surrounded by a layer of spicules and can survive conditions that would kill adult sponges. When the environment becomes less hostile, the gemmule resumes growing.

References

Feldkamp, Susan (2002). Modern Biology. United States: Holt, Rinehart, and Winston. p. 695. Accessed on May 23, 2006.

Sponge anatomy